Gabriela Talabă was the defending champion, but lost in the first round to Alexa Glatch.

Caroline Dolehide won the title, defeating Grace Min in the final, 6–2, 6–7(5–7), 6–0.

Seeds

Draw

Finals

Top half

Bottom half

References

Main Draw

LTP Charleston Pro Tennis II - Singles
LTP Charleston Pro Tennis